Who Killed John Savage? is a 1937 British mystery film directed by Maurice Elvey and starring Nicholas Hannen, Barry MacKay, Kathleen Kelly, Henry Oscar and Edward Chapman. The film is based on a novel by Philip MacDonald and is a remake of the 1932 Michael Powell-directed film Rynox.

Premise
A businessman is found dead, leaving police detectives to work out whether it was suicide or murder.

Cast
John Savage - Nicholas Hannen	
Anthony Benedict - Barry MacKay	
Inspector Chortley - Edward Chapman	
Kate Savage - Kathleen Kelly	
Woolrich - Henry Oscar	
Smith - Ross Landon	
Prout -  George Kirby
Scruggs - C. Denier Warren

Critical reception
TV Guide gave the film two out of four stars, and wrote, "though slow to develop, this is an interesting mystery with some nicely detailed moments. Some good thesping by the ensemble overcomes the directorial sluggishness to create an unusual whodunit."

References

External links

1937 films
British mystery films
1930s English-language films
Films directed by Maurice Elvey
Films based on British novels
British black-and-white films
1937 mystery films
1930s British films